Events in the year 1802 in Portugal.

Incumbents
Monarch: Mary I

Events

Arts and entertainment

Sports

Births

23 August – Manuel Inocêncio Liberato dos Santos, musician (died 1887).
26 October – Miguel I of Portugal, king (died 1866)

Deaths

References

 
Years of the 19th century in Portugal